The 2015 Baylor Bears football team represented Baylor University in the 2015 NCAA Division I FBS football season. The Bears were coached by Art Briles, playing their 117th football season; this year was the team's second season in McLane Stadium in Waco, Texas. The Bears were members of the Big 12 Conference. They finished the season 10–3, 6–3 in Big 12 play to finish in fourth place. They were invited to the Russell Athletic Bowl where they defeated North Carolina 49–38. on November 14th Baylor was upset at home vs 15 Oklahoma

Recruiting

Schedule

Schedule Source:

Rankings

Roster

Game summaries

@ SMU

Lamar

Rice

vs. Texas Tech

@ Kansas

West Virginia

Iowa State

@ Kansas State

Oklahoma

@ Oklahoma State

@ TCU

Texas

vs. North Carolina

References

Baylor
Baylor Bears football seasons
Cheez-It Bowl champion seasons
Baylor Bears football